Christian Heritage School is the name of several schools in the United States:

Christian Heritage Schools (Texas), in San Antonio, Texas
Christian Heritage School (Steamboat Springs, Colorado), in Steamboat Springs, Colorado
Christian Heritage School (Trumbull, Connecticut), in Trumbull, Connecticut
Christian Heritage School (Dalton, Georgia), in Dalton, Georgia
Christian Heritage School (Tyler, Texas), in Tyler, Texas
Christian Heritage School (Washington), in Edwall, Washington
Christian Heritage School (Longview, Texas), in Longview, Texas

See also
 Heritage (disambiguation)
 Heritage School (disambiguation)
 Heritage High School (disambiguation)
 American Heritage School (disambiguation)
 Heritage Academy (disambiguation)
 Heritage College (disambiguation)